Karate competed by men and women at the 2006 Asian Games in Doha, Qatar. Kata contested along with Kumite in seven weight classes for men and four for women. All competition took place at the Qatar Sports Club Indoor Hall on December 12 and 13. Each country was limited to having 5 male and 3 female athletes.

Schedule

Medalists

Men

Women

Medal table

Participating nations
A total of 196 athletes from 34 nations competed in karate at the 2006 Asian Games:

References

External links
Official website

 
2006
2006 Asian Games events